Antaeotricha utahensis is a moth in the family Depressariidae. It was described by Clifford D. Ferris in 2012. It is endemic to North America, where it has been recorded in Utah and New Mexico.

References

Moths described in 2012
utahensis
Moths of North America